The State Bank of New South Wales, from 1933 until 1981 known as the Rural Bank of New South Wales, was a bank that was owned by the Government of New South Wales. It existed from 1933 until 1994, when it was taken over by the Colonial State Bank and then the Commonwealth Bank in 2000.

History of operations

Founding and growth
By early 1931, the Government Savings Bank was in financial trouble in the midst of the Great Depression, and on 22 April 1931 the Bank suspended payments after a drain on its cash resources. On 15 December 1931, the majority of the Government Savings Bank was amalgamated into the Commonwealth Savings Bank. The Rural Bank and Advance Homes Departments of the Government Savings Bank were not taken over by the Commonwealth Savings Bank, and continued to operate. In late 1932, the NSW Government led by Assistant Treasurer Eric Spooner introduced legislation to reconstitute what remained of the Government Savings Bank into a new "Rural Bank of New South Wales", with a specific mandate to support primary industries and not to operate as a traditional general lending bank, governed by a board of three commissioners.

On 23 December 1932, the Rural Bank of New South Wales Act, 1932 was passed by the NSW Parliament, and on 1 July 1933 the new institution and board of commissioners commenced operations to replace the old Government Savings Bank. The former chairman of the GSB, William O'Malley Wood, was appointed president and commissioner, with Clarence McKerihan and Henry Rogers appointed as commissioners.

On 19 December 1947, the NSW Parliament passed the Rural Bank of New South Wales (General Banking) Act, 1947, which merged the Rural Bank Department, the Advances for Homes Department, and the Personal Loans Department, into a General Bank Department, and authorised the bank to operate as a regular trading bank. On this change, the Premier of NSW, Jim McGirr, commented:

State Bank
On 2 November 1981, the State Bank Act came into effect, which reconstituted the Rural Bank as the "State Bank of New South Wales", governed by a board of seven directors, and changed the mandate to that of a standard commercial bank. The bank's slogan for many years was "We do more for you personally". On the change of the Rural Bank to the State Bank, a former bank employee, Bruce R. Turner, later recalled: 

The bank was 'corporatised' in 1990, under the State Owned Corporations Act 1989 (NSW) and the State Bank (Corporatisation) Act 1989 (NSW). On 14 May 1990, the existing State Bank was dissolved, and all of its assets and business undertaking were vested in an incorporated State Bank, limited by shares.

Privatisation and merger
On 23 November 1994, the NSW Government sold the bank to Colonial Mutual, a financial services company, through the State Bank (Privatisation) Act 1994. Although initially retaining the State Bank name, the bank then changed its name to Colonial State Bank in 1996. In 2000, it too was taken over, this time by the Commonwealth Bank of Australia.

Executives

Rural Bank, 1933–1981
The board of the Rural Bank consisted of three (later five) commissioners appointed by the Governor on the advice of the Premier for a term of seven years, with one of the commissioners appointed as president/general manager. A deputy president could also be appointed to fill in during a long period of absence of the president.

Presidents

Commissioners

State Bank, 1981–1994
From 2 November 1981, the board of the State Bank consisted of seven directors appointed by the Governor on the advice of the Premier, with one of the directors appointed as managing director.

Managing Directors/CEO

Directors

Former bank buildings

There are many former buildings of the Rural Bank and its successors that are heritage listed:
253, 257 Auburn Street, Goulburn (Goulburn Mulwaree LEP).
16-22 Kurrajong Avenue, Leeton (1935; Leeton LEP).
Corner Macquarie Street and Memorial Avenue, Liverpool (Liverpool LEP).
1 Wharf Street, Murwillumbah (Tweed LEP).
92-94 Hyde Street, Bellingen (Bellingen LEP).
32 Blackwall Road, Woy Woy (Central Coast LEP).
16 George Street, Parramatta (1938; Parramatta LEP).
107 Otho Street, Inverell (Inverell LEP).
217-223 Cressy Street, Deniliquin (1935; Edward River LEP).
94-100 Summerland Way, Kyogle (Kyogle LEP).
150 Mann Street, Gosford (1934; Central Coast LEP).
98 Pacific Highway, Wyong (Central Coast LEP).
45 Bridge Street, Muswellbrook (1935 archaeology remains; Muswellbrook LEP).
2 Station Street, Quirindi (1908/1932; Liverpool Plains LEP).
Cnr Railway and Kooyoo Streets, Griffith (Griffith LEP).
113 Barker Street, Casino (1935; Richmond Valley LEP).
274 Parker Street, Cootamundra (Cootamundra–Gundagai LEP).
145-149 Sanger Street, Corowa (1936; Federation LEP).
44-46 Tapio Avenue, Dareton (Wentworth LEP).
110 Main Street, West Wyalong (Bland LEP).
642 Dean Street, Albury (1937; Albury LEP).
140 Victoria Street, Taree (1935; Mid-Coast LEP).
70 Yapunyah Street, Barellan (Narrandera LEP).
62 Market Street, Mudgee (1926; Mid-Western Regional LEP).
245 Grey Street, Glen Innes (1935; Glen Innes Severn LEP).
159 Hoskins Street, Temora (1934; Temora LEP).
65 Dandaloo Street, Narromine (1939; Narromine LEP).
147 Comur Street, Yass (1886/1935; Yass Valley LEP).
192 High Street, Hillston (1935/1939; Carrathool LEP).

References

External links

Defunct banks of Australia
State Bank of New South Wales
Australian companies established in 1933
Banks established in 1933
Australian companies disestablished in 1994
Banks disestablished in 1994
Former government-owned companies of New South Wales